Quarantined Rivals is a 1927 American silent romantic comedy film directed by Archie Mayo and starring Robert Agnew, Kathleen Collins and John Miljan. It was produced by the independent studio Gotham Pictures. It was based on a 1906 short story of the same title by George Randolph Chester.

Synopsis
The plot revolves around Bruce Farney (a football player) and his attempts to woo Elsie Peyton in the face of competition from a rival, as well as becoming mixed up with an attractive manicurist Minette. Complications ensue when both Bruce and his rival are forced to quarantine together due to smallpox.

Cast
 Robert Agnew as 	Bruce Farney
 Kathleen Collins as Elsie Peyton
 John Miljan as Ed, the barber
 Ray Hallor as 	Robert Howard
 Viora Daniel as Minette, the manicurist
 Guinn 'Big Boy' Williams as 	Joe, the plumber 
 Clarissa Selwynne as 	Mrs. Peyton
 George C. Pearce as Mr. Peyton
 William A. O'Connor as Mort
 Josephine Borio as Maid

References

Bibliography
 Connelly, Robert B. The Silents: Silent Feature Films, 1910-36, Volume 40, Issue 2. December Press, 1998.
 Munden, Kenneth White. The American Film Institute Catalog of Motion Pictures Produced in the United States, Part 1. University of California Press, 1997.

External links
 

1927 films
1927 comedy films
American silent feature films
Films directed by Archie Mayo
American black-and-white films
Gotham Pictures films
1920s English-language films
1920s American films
Silent American comedy films